Operation Hermes may refer to:

 Operation Hermes, a coalition military operation of the Iraq War
 Joint Operation Hermes, an operation of the European Border and Coast Guard Agency
 Operation Hermes, a 1970 planned coup against Makarios, facilitated by Polycarpos Giorkatzis